There are at least 51 named mountains in Blaine County, Montana.
 Barber Butte, el. 
 Belcher Peak, el. 
 Birch Creek Hill, el. 
 Bird Tail Butte, el. 
 Black Butte, el. 
 Black Butte, el. 
 Black Butte, el. 
 Blue Stone Peak, el. 
 Chimney Butte, el. 
 Coming Day Butte, el. 
 Corrigan Mountain, el. 
 Crown Butte, el. 
 Damon Hill, el. 
 Eagle Child Mountain, el. 
 East Butte, el. 
 Echo Butte, el. 
 Elkhorn Mountain, el. 
 Goat Mountain, el. 
 Gumbo Butte, el. 
 Hansen Butte, el. 
 Haystack Butte, el. 
 Index Butte, el. 
 Iron Butte, el. 
 Johnson Butte, el. 
 Lion Butte, el. 
 Lloyd Butte, el. 
 Lookout Butte, el. 
 Mans Head Rock, el. 
 McCann Butte, el. 
 Middle Butte, el. 
 Miles Butte, el. 
 Mission Peak, el. 
 Mouse Butte, el. 
 Murphy Butte, el. 
 Myrtle Butte, el. 
 Rabbit Hills, el. 
 Rattlesnake Butte, el. 
 Rieve Butte, el. 
 Saddle Rock, el. 
 Sawtooth Mountain, el. 
 Sayer Butte, el. 
 Scotty Butte, el. 
 Snake Butte, el. 
 Spirit Woman Butte, el. 
 Suction Butte, el. 
 Taylor Butte, el. 
 Thunder Butte, el. 
 Timber Butte, el. 
 West Butte, el. 
 Wild Horse Butte, el. 
 Williamson Butte, el.

See also
 List of mountains in Montana
 List of mountain ranges in Montana

Notes

Landforms of Blaine County, Montana
Blaine